Stanley Gower (possibly baptised 29 March 1600, died 1660) was a puritan minister in the Church of England. Notably he was one of the Westminster Divines.

In 1613 Gower became a pupil of the notable puritan minister Richard Rothwell who later on prepared Gower for university. In 1621 Gower went up to Trinity College Dublin, where he was elected a Scholar in 1621, and graduated with a Bachelor of Arts in 1625. In 1630 he was appointed the curate of Attercliffe, remaining there until 1635.  After a period in Hertfordshire, Gower went to London in 1643 where he took part in the Westminster Assembly until 1649.

His son Humphrey Gower was born in 1638.

Notes

External links
Oxford Dictionary of National Biography - Gower, Stanley

1660 deaths
Alumni of Trinity College Dublin
Scholars of Trinity College Dublin
Westminster Divines
Year of birth missing